Chalcothore montgomeryi is a species of damselfly in the family Polythoridae. It is endemic to Venezuela.  Its natural habitat is rivers. It is threatened by habitat loss.

References

Sources

Endemic fauna of Venezuela
Polythoridae
Odonata of South America
Insects described in 1968
Taxonomy articles created by Polbot